Arisa pitha is a traditional sweet pancake from Odisha, India. The crispy outer layer surrounds soft insides. It is also known by the name 'Hilsa' in Bihar, Jharkhand and Uttar Pradesh. It is the traditional sweet in Coastal Andhra of Andhra Pradesh as well where it is known as 'Ariselu'.

Ingredients 

 1 kg of rice flour
 half kg of Jaggery
 1 tsp of Cinnamon (powdered)
 200 gm of Vegetable Oil or Ghee
 1/2  tsp of Salt
 sesame seeds

Preparation 

A thick jantani (semi solid mixture cooked and kneaded for some time) of rice flour and sugar or jaggery is made into small semi-flat round shapes and fried in ghee or oil till golden brown.

Boil 2 L water in a wide mouth pan, add sugar, salt, cinnamon powder and 1 tbsp ghee. Pour rice powder (Powdered rice) slowly and stir continuously, cover the pan and reduce the flame. Cook until it absorbs the water completely (to the consistency of chapati). Let it cool. Knead it to make a smooth dough. Heat a pan, add coconut and sugar and fry till the coconut turns golden brown. Make small balls of semolina dough, roll it and stuff it with the fried coconut, sesame seeds. Deep fry till golden brown.

See also 

 Kakara Pitha
 Rasagolla
 Chhena Poda
 Kheersagar
 Chhena Jalebi
 Chhena Kheeri
 Guda Arisa Pitha

References 

 arisa pitha recipe in hindi

Indian desserts
Odia cuisine